Gavialis is a genus of crocodylians that includes the living gharial Gavialis gangeticus and one known extinct species, Gavialis bengawanicus. G. gangeticus comes from the Indian Subcontinent, while G. bengawanicus is known from Java. Gavialis likely first appeared in the Indian Subcontinent in the Pliocene and dispersed into the Malay Archipelago through a path called the Siva–Malayan route in the Quaternary. Remains attributed to Gavialis have also been found on Sulawesi and Woodlark Island east of the Wallace Line, suggesting a prehistoric lineage of Gavialis was able to traverse marine environments and reach places possibly as far as western Oceania.

The genus Gavialis was reevaluated in 2018 based on specimens in the Natural History Museum, London that were collected in the Sivalik Hills. The author concluded that G. gangeticus and G. bengawanicus are the only two species in the genus Gavialis, with G. hysudricus as a junior synonym of G. gangeticus. Rhamphosuchus is proposed to include G. leptodus, G. pachyrhynchus, G. curvirostris and G. breviceps. The species G. browni and G. lewisi require further revisions. G. dixoni has been assigned its own genus, Dollosuchus.

The below cladogram of the major extant crocodile groups is based on the latest molecular studies, and shows the gharial's close relationship to the false gharial, and how the gavialids and crocodiles are more closely related than the alligatoroids:

Here is a more detailed cladogram that shows Gavialis's proposed placement within Gavialidae, including extinct members:

References

Gavialidae
Extant Burdigalian first appearances
Reptile genera
Reptile genera with one living species